Mushoku Tensei is a Japanese light novel series written by  Originally published on the internet web novel website Shōsetsuka ni Narō since November 22, 2012, a year later, it was announced the series would receive a print release under Media Factory's MF Books imprint with illustrations done by a Pixiv user called  A manga adaptation by Yuka Fujikawa began serialization in the June 2014 issue of Monthly Comic Flapper. Seven Seas Entertainment licensed the tankōbon volumes of the manga for localization in North America. The company also has licensed the original light novels. Seven Seas made changes in their translations of the light novels such as toning down Rudeus' perverted behavior and removing references to rape.

Rifujin na Magonote published his work on the online web novel website Shōsetsuka ni Narō, the first chapter was uploaded on November 22, 2012. In November 2013, the author announced his work was to be released as a light novel under Media Factory's MF Books imprint; regardless, the author stated his intentions to continue publishing his chapters online. The illustrator for the light novel is a Pixiv user called Shirotaka. Seven Seas Entertainment has licensed the light novels for publication in North America.

Web novel

Light novel

Manga
In the May 2014 issue of Monthly Comic Flapper, it was announced that the manga adaptation of Mushoku Tensei by Yuka Fujikawa would premiere in the June issue; though Yuka is the author of the manga series, character designs are credited to SiroTaka. Media Works collected the individual chapters into tankōbon volumes; the first volume was released in October 2014. In January 2015, Seven Seas Entertainment announced its licensing of the manga series for localization in North America under the title Mushoku Tensei: Jobless Reincarnation.

Volumes

Notes
 represents the web novel of the series in the format of X.Y, where X represents the volume and Y represents the chapter number. P stands for the prologue chapter, which is not numbered.
 represents a special chapter added in the light novel volumes. The number beside the note denotes the volume number.

References

External links
  at Shōsetsuka ni Narō 
 Official light novel website 
 Official manga website 

Mushoku Tensei
Mushoku Tensei